Maralal is a small hillside market town in northern Kenya, lying east of the Loroghi Plateau within Samburu County, of which it is the capital. It is the administrative headquarters of Samburu county. The town has an urban population of 16,281 (1999 census). The market was pioneered by Somali settlers in the 1920s.

Main sights
Approximately 2 km southwest of the town are the remains of the Maralal National Sanctuary. This nature site, closed by the Samburu County Government in September 2014, has now largely been absorbed into the town and the wildlife eradicated by poachers. Encroachment began from the south as villages expanded, so causing the natural wildlife corridors to be closed.

Maralal is also home to Kenyatta House, where Jomo Kenyatta was detained prior to his release. This rather unassuming modern house has a significant place in the history of modern Kenya.

Until 2016, the town hosted the Maralal International Camel Derby, but this has ceased to function primarily due to the outcry by foreign tourists objecting to the abuse of the animals used. Tourist activities in Maralal have slowed and the town is mostly a base for adventurous travellers heading to Lake Turkana, some 12 hours travel by road to the north.

Accommodation is cheap and lacking any sophistication, but improved roads heading to Maralal from the south should be completed by 2019, at which time tourism opportunities might improve. The closest airport is Kisima Airport, located in the nearby village of Kisima.

Transport
The main road to Maralal starts from Gilgil and passes through Nyahururu and Rumuruti and ends in Baragoi. The entire stretch up to Maralal is tarmac, but is unpaved past that. The President of Kenya also launched work on the paved Naibor–Kisima–Maralal road in July 2017.

References 

Populated places in Samburu County
County capitals in Kenya